{{Speciesbox
| image = Pinus pseudostrobus var apulcensis 2.jpg
| image_caption = var. apulcensis in cultivation
| status = LC
| status_system = IUCN3.1
| status_ref = 
| genus = Pinus
| parent = Pinus subsect. Ponderosae
| display_parents = 3
| species = pseudostrobus
| authority = Lindl.
| range_map = Pinus pseudostrobus range map 1.png
| range_map_caption = Natural range of Pinus pseudostrobus. Pinus pseudostrobus is also found in El Salvador.
| synonyms = Pinus angulata Roezl
 
Pinus alpucensis Lindl.

Pinus astecaensis Roezl ex Gordon

Pinus coatepecensis (Martínez)Gaussen

Pinus estevezii (Martínez) J.P.Perry

Pinus heteromorpha Roezl

Pinus nubicola J.P.Perry

Pinus oaxana Mirov 

Pinus orizabae Gordon

Pinus prasina Roezl

Pinus protuberans Roezl<ref>{{cite web |title=Pinus pseudostrobus f.protuberans |url=https://powo.science.kew.org/taxon/urn:lsid:ipni.org:names:197074-2 |website=Plants of the World Online |access-date=4 April 2021 |ref=5}}</ref>Pinus regeliana RoezlPinus yecorensis Debreczy & I.Ràcz

}}Pinus pseudostrobus, known in English as the smooth-bark Mexican pine and in Spanish as chamite or pacingo, is a tree found in forests of Mexico and Central America.  
It is 8 to 25 m tall with a dense and round top.It is threatened by logging and wood harvesting. The bark is brown and fissured and smooth when young.  It is subject to ex-situ conservation. It grows at altitudes between 850 and 3250 m. from 26° to 15° north latitude, from Sinaloa, Mexico to Nicaragua and Honduras. It occurs within a rainfall regime that rains mostly in summer. 

A stand of about 15 fully mature smooth-bark Mexican pines is in Imperial County, California, at the Palo Verde County Park, in a narrow strip of land between Hwy 78 and the Colorado River. 

English botanist John Lindley described the species in 1839. It is divided into Pinus pseudostrobus var.apulcensis (Lindl.)Shaw (Apulco pine), Pinus pseudostrobus f.protuberans Martínez and Pinus pseudostrobus var.pseudostrobus''.

It has been introduced in New Zealand near sea level and has done well.

References

pseudostrobus
Trees of Mexico
Trees of Puebla
Garden plants of North America
Ornamental trees
Trees of temperate climates
Least concern plants
Taxonomy articles created by Polbot
Flora of the Sierra Madre Occidental
Flora of the Sierra Madre Oriental
Flora of Central Mexico
Flora of the Trans-Mexican Volcanic Belt
Flora of the Chiapas Highlands